Donlan may refer to:

Places
Donlan, West Virginia

People with the name Donlan
C. Josh Donlan
Gretchen Donlan
James Donlan
Kenneth Donlan
Steve Donlan
Stuart Donlan
Yolande Donlan